The Type 7 30 cm howitzer was a howitzer used by the Imperial Japanese Army in the Second Sino-Japanese War,  Soviet–Japanese border conflicts and during the Pacific Campaign in World War II. The designation Type 7 indicates its year of introduction, the seventh year of the reign of Emperor Taishō, or 1918 according to the Gregorian calendar.

Design 
The Type 7 was conventional for its time and other nations had similar weapons such as the Italian Obice da 305/17, Russian 11-inch mortar M1877, and the 12-inch coast defense mortar from the United States.  The theory of operation for the Type 7 was that a low-velocity howitzer firing a large shell at a high-angle was more likely to destroy an enemy ship by penetrating its thin deck armor than a high-velocity low-angle gun attempting to penetrate its thicker belt armor.  The downside was that high-angle fire was harder to aim correctly so more howitzers would be needed to defend an area from attack.  However, if the area was constrained by geography like a port at the mouth of a river the navigation channels could be measured ahead of time and firing ranges calculated.  A complicating factor was as naval artillery progressed their size and range soon eclipsed its range.

The Type 7 howitzer was introduced to supplement the Armstrong-designed 28 cm L/10 howitzer as coastal artillery with a secondary siege artillery role. The Type 7s were typical built-up guns of the period, with rifled steel inner tubes and layers of external reinforcing hoops. The guns had interrupted screw breeches and fired separate loading cased charges and projectiles. Firing was by percussion cap and hammer tripped by a long lanyard. There were two variants of the Type 7 produced, one with a short, L/16 caliber, barrel, and one with a long, L/23 caliber, barrel. The long barreled version weighed nearly twice as much as the short barreled version.  

This mount allowed 360° of traverse and +2° to +73° of elevation. The recoil system for the Type 7 consisted of a U shaped gun cradle which held the trunnioned barrel and a slightly inclined firing platform with a hydro-gravity recoil system above the breech. When the gun fired, the hydraulic buffers slowed the recoil of the cradle which slid up a set of inclined rails on the firing platform and then returned the gun to position by the combined action of the buffers and gravity. Two equilibrators were mounted below the barrel and two compressed air-tanks were mounted on the carriage for blowing out the tube after firing.

History 
In 1933, the short-barreled Type 7 was modified so that it could be quickly disassembled into nine wagon loads, transported and reassembled on site.

In February 1940, two Type 7 long-barreled howitzers were moved to the Kotō fortress in Manchuria to strengthen Japanese defenses in the event of a Soviet attack. The Japanese army had eight fortresses built along the border with the Soviet Union, of which the Kotō fortress on the Ussuri River was the strongest. Large-scale fortifications, similar to the Maginot Line, were guarded by the 4th Border Guard Unit. The 1,400-strong crew had two batteries of field guns and howitzers, two Type 90 240 mm railway guns, and one experimental 41 cm howitzer. When the Soviets attacked the Japanese positions around the Kotō fortress in Operation August Storm in 1945, the entire fortress crew and all guns were lost.

It is believed that ten Type 7s were used by the Japanese during the Battle of Corregidor in 1942.

In 1944, the 4th Independent Heavy Artillery Battalion with Type 7 short-barreled howitzers was ordered to the Philippines in anticipation of American landings. At the top of the picture is a Type 7 which was captured by US soldiers of the 158th Regiment on Luzon. The howitzer was disguised by a house that could be pushed back on rails just before firing. A garden with banana trees was planted around the position to increase the camouflage effect.

Four Type 7s were used for coastal defense on Honshu in 1945.

Photo gallery

References

Notes

World War II artillery of Japan
Coastal artillery
Siege artillery
305 mm artillery